"Who's Gonna Ride Your Wild Horses" is a song by Irish rock band U2. It is the fifth track on their 1991 album Achtung Baby, and was released as its fifth and final single in November 1992.

Writing and recording
"Who's Gonna Ride Your Wild Horses" began as a demo that the band recorded at STS Studios in 1990. The band worked on it during the formal Achtung Baby sessions, including several failed attempts at Hansa Studios in Berlin. This produced several versions of the song and about a dozen mixes. However, the original demo remained their preferred version. Producer Jimmy Iovine, in particular, expressed his preference for the demo version when lead vocalist Bono played it for him. During the group's time recording in Dublin in 1991, producer Steve Lillywhite was brought on to provide a "fresh pair of ears" and mix the song. The album version most closely resembles the original demo.

Lillywhite recalls that, "They hated that song. I spent a month on it and I still don't think it was as realised as it could've been. The Americans had heard it and said, 'That's your radio song there', because they were having trouble with some of the more industrial elements [of the album]. It's almost like a covers band doing a U2 moment. Maybe we tried too hard." Bono said, "It's a song I feel we didn't quite nail on the record because there was another whole set of lyrics that were dumped and I wrote those quickly and off we went." The band later released an alternately arranged "Temple Bar Remix" as the single, the version of the song they most prefer.  The band also has claimed they find the song difficult to perform in concert. Bassist Adam Clayton said, "It's a great torch song, with melody and emotion, but I don't think we ever captured it again and we have never really been able to play the song live."

Single release
When the covers to "Even Better Than the Real Thing," "The Fly," "Who's Gonna Ride Your Wild Horses," and "Mysterious Ways" are arranged, a picture of the band members driving a Trabant is formed. The single includes Bono's solo version of "Can't Help Falling in Love," which was recorded in STS studios in Dublin on 29 June 1992 for the movie Honeymoon in Vegas. The song was released in the United Kingdom on 23 November 1992.

Live performances
The song was performed in full during the first two legs and the first show of the third leg during the Zoo TV Tour in 1992, often featuring extended bridges or extra solos by The Edge. It made a few appearances during the rest of the tour in a shorter, solo acoustic form. Lines from the song were added at the end of their song "Bad" during the final leg of the Elevation Tour. During the Vertigo Tour, the song has appeared on several occasions, first in an electric version similar to the album version, and later in an acoustic version somewhat reminiscent of the "Temple Bar Remix" used for the single. Thirteen years later, the song became an integral part of the so-called "Zoo Suite" during the Experience + Innocence Tour in 2018.

Garbage cover version
Garbage reworked the song for the 2011 tribute album AHK-toong BAY-bi Covered. "Achtung Baby was a huge influence on the first Garbage album," remarked Butch Vig. "It's groovy and gritty, hi-fi and lo-fi, industrial and orchestral. We picked this song because we love the lyrics. We stripped the verses down and changed the major chord to minor chord, which makes the lyrics more bittersweet. We were in the studio making the new Garbage album at the time; this was a good distraction."

Formats and track listings

Charts

Weekly charts

Year-end charts

See also
List of covers of U2 songs - Who's Gonna Ride Your Wild Horses

References

External links
 Lyrics and list of performances at U2.com

1992 singles
U2 songs
Island Records singles
Song recordings produced by Brian Eno
Songs written by Bono
Songs written by the Edge
Songs written by Adam Clayton
Songs written by Larry Mullen Jr.
Song recordings produced by Daniel Lanois
Song recordings produced by Steve Lillywhite
Music videos directed by Phil Joanou
1991 songs